Mokiyevskaya is a rural locality (a village) in Verkhovskoye Rural Settlement, Verkhovazhsky District, Vologda Oblast, Russia. The population was 26 as of 2002.

Geography 
The distance to Verkhovazhye is 28 km, to Smetanino is 4 km. Osnovinskaya, Kudrinskaya, Priluk are the nearest rural localities.

References 

Rural localities in Verkhovazhsky District